Johanne de Silva (born 16 January 2001) is a Sri Lankan cricketer. He made his List A debut on 14 December 2019, for Sri Lanka Navy Sports Club in the 2019–20 Invitation Limited Over Tournament.

References

External links
 

2001 births
Living people
Sri Lankan cricketers
Sri Lanka Navy Sports Club cricketers
Place of birth missing (living people)